The Tailteann Games, Tailtin Fair, Áenach Tailteann, Aonach Tailteann, Assembly of Talti, Fair of Taltiu or Festival of Taltii were funeral games associated with the semi-legendary history of Pre-Christian Ireland.

There is a complex of ancient earthworks dating to the Iron Age in the area of Teltown where the festival was historically known to be celebrated off and on from medieval times into the modern era.

History and archaeology
The games were founded, according to the Book of Invasions, by Lugh Lámhfhada, the Ollamh Érenn (master craftsman or doctor of the sciences), as a mourning ceremony for the death of his foster-mother Tailtiu. Lugh buried Tailtiu underneath a mound in an area that took her name and was later called Tailteann in County Meath.

The event was held during the last fortnight of July and culminated with the celebration of Lughnasadh, or Lammas Eve (1 August). Modern folklore claims that the Tailteann Games started around 1600 BC, with some sources claiming as far back as 1829 BC. Promotional literature for the Gaelic Athletic Association revival of the games in 1924 claimed a later date of their foundation in 632 BC. The games were known to have been held between the 6th and 9th centuries AD. The games were held until 1169-1171 AD when they died out after the Norman invasion.

The ancient Aonach had three functions: honoring the dead, proclaiming laws, and funeral games and festivities to entertain. The first function took between one and three days depending on the importance of the deceased. Guests would sing mourning chants called the Guba, after which druids would improvise Cepógs, songs in memory of the dead. The dead would then be burnt on a funeral pyre. The second function would then be carried out during a universal truce by the Ollamh Érenn, giving out laws to the people via bards and druids and culminating in the igniting of another massive fire. The custom of rejoicing after a funeral was then enshrined in the Cuiteach Fuait, games of mental and physical ability.

Games included the long jump, high jump, running, hurling, spear throwing, boxing, contests in swordfighting, archery, wrestling, swimming, and chariot and horse racing. They also included competitions in strategy, singing, dancing and story-telling, along with crafts competitions for goldsmiths, jewellers, weavers and armourers. Along with ensuring a meritocracy, the games would also feature a mass arranged marriage, where couples met for the first time and were given up to a year and a day to divorce on the hills of separation.

In later medieval times, the games were revived and called the Tailten Fair, consisting of contests of strength and skill, horse races, religious celebrations, and a traditional time for couples to contract "Handfasting" trial marriages. "Taillten marriages" were legal up until the 13th century. This trial marriage practice is documented in the fourth and fifth volumes of the Brehon law texts, which are compilations of the opinions and judgements of the Brehon class of Druids (in this case, Irish). The texts as a whole deal with copious detail for the Insular Celts.

Modern revivals

From the late nineteenth century, the Gaelic Athletic Association (GAA) and others in the Gaelic revival contemplated reviving the Tailteann Games. The GAA's 1888 championships  of football and of hurling were unfinished owing to the American Invasion Tour, an unsuccessful attempt to raise funds for a revival.

The Second Dáil approved a scheme in 1922, and after a delay caused by the Irish Civil War the first was held in 1924. Open to foreigners of Irish heritage, the first games of 1924 and 1928 attracted some competitors fresh from the Olympics in Paris and Amsterdam. The Games' main backer, minister J. J. Walsh, lost office when Fianna Fáil took power after the 1932 election, and public funding was cut. The 1932 games were on a smaller scale against a background of the Great Depression and the Anglo-Irish Trade War, and no further games were held.

Jack Fitzsimons suggested reviving the Tailteann Games in a 1985 Seanad Éireann debate on tourism in Ireland.

The Rás Tailteann ("Tailteann race") cycling race was founded in 1953 by the National Cycling Association (NCA), in opposition to the Tour of Ireland organised by the rival Cumann Rothaíochta na hÉireann (CRÉ). Cycling Ireland, the merged successor to both the NCA and CRÉ, still organises the Rás Tailteann annually, but it is usually known as "the [sponsor] Rás", or simply "the Rás".

The Irish Secondary Schools Athletic Association organised annual national championships from 1963 under the name "Junior Tailteann Games". Athletics Ireland continues to use the name "Tailteann Games" for its annual schools inter-provincial championships. also independently the tailteann games are an inter-gaeltacht event that includes other activities.

Annalistic references
See Annals of Inisfallen

 AI875.1 Kl. Muiredach son of Bran, king of Laigin, harried UíNéill as far as Sliab Fuait, and the Fair of Tailltiu was held.

References

Sources
 Lewis Spence, The History and Origins of Druidism
 Elizabeth Pepper and John Wilcock, Magical and Mystical Sites

External links

 Nally, T.H., The Aonac Tailteann and the Tailteann Games Their History and Ancient Associations - Full text on archive.org

Sport in antiquity
Irish mythology
Druidry
History of County Meath
Sports festivals in Ireland
Recurring sporting events established before 1750
1169 disestablishments
Medieval Ireland
Lugh